Aberdeen College was one of the largest further education colleges in Scotland. It was formed from the amalgamation of the former Aberdeen Technical College, Aberdeen College of Commerce and Clinterty Agricultural College.

In November 2013, Aberdeen College merged with Banff & Buchan College to form North East Scotland College. The new regional college will serve an extensive geographical area with its main centres in Aberdeen and Fraserburgh.

References

See also
 List of further and higher education colleges in Scotland
 Aberdeen College Website

Education in Aberdeen
Higher education colleges in Scotland
2013 disestablishments in Scotland